William Barron Calhoun (December 29, 1796 – November 8, 1865) was a U.S. Representative from Massachusetts.

Early life
Calhoun, the eldest child of Andrew Calhoun and Martha (Chamberlain) Calhoun,  was born on December 29, 1796, in Boston, Massachusetts.  Calhoun graduated from Yale College in 1814.

After his graduation from Yale, Calhoun studied law, first in Concord, New Hampshire, and later in Springfield, Massachusetts. 
Calhoun was admitted to the bar and commenced practice in Springfield.

Calhoun served as member of the Massachusetts House of Representatives 1825-1834, serving as speaker 1828-1834.

Election to Congress
Calhoun was elected as an Anti-Jacksonian to the Twenty-fourth Congress and as a Whig to the three succeeding Congresses (March 4, 1835 – March 3, 1843).
Calhoun served as chairman of the Committee on Private Land Claims (Twenty-sixth Congress).
Calhoun was not a candidate for renomination in 1842.

Post Congressional career
In 1844 Calhoun was a Presidential Elector for Henry Clay.

Calhoun served as member of the Massachusetts Senate in 1846 and 1847, serving as its president.
He served as Secretary of the Commonwealth of Massachusetts 1848-1851 and State bank commissioner from 1853 to 1855.
He served as mayor of Springfield, Massachusetts in 1859.
He was again a member of the Massachusetts House of Representatives in 1861.

Death and interment
Calhoun died in Springfield, Massachusetts, November 8, 1865, he was interred in Springfield Cemetery.

See also
 53rd Massachusetts General Court (1832)
 54th Massachusetts General Court (1833)
 55th Massachusetts General Court (1834)
 68th Massachusetts General Court (1847)

References

External links

 Yale Obituary Record

Notes

1796 births
1865 deaths
Mayors of Springfield, Massachusetts
Massachusetts state senators
Members of the Massachusetts House of Representatives
Presidents of the Massachusetts Senate
Speakers of the Massachusetts House of Representatives
Secretaries of the Commonwealth of Massachusetts
Politicians from Boston
Massachusetts lawyers
Yale College alumni
Massachusetts National Republicans
National Republican Party members of the United States House of Representatives
Whig Party members of the United States House of Representatives from Massachusetts
19th-century American politicians
19th-century American lawyers